Landes de Gascogne Regional Natural Park (French: Parc naturel régional des Landes de Gascogne) is a protected area of pine forest, wetland and oceanic coastline located in the Landes de Gascogne natural region of Nouvelle-Aquitaine in southwestern France.

History
The lands comprising the park were largely unpopulated throughout history. The roughly triangular area of the modern-day park was originally an inland sea which had receded, leaving a mostly infertile depression which did not attract human habitation. Largescale public works helped drain, clear, and reforest the area during the nineteenth century but the transformation was limited. By the mid-twentieth century, government attention had turned to protecting the natural environment.

Geography
Straddling the departments of Landes and Gironde, Parc naturel régional des Landes de Gascogne comprises the center of the massive forest of Landes. The park extends southeast from Arcachon Bay in Pays de Buch and encompasses the entire Leyre River.

As of 2011, the park holds 41 small communes with approximately 60,000 inhabitants.

Member communes
The forty-one member communes are:

Argelouse
Audenge
Belhade
Belin-Beliet
Biganos
Bourideys
Brocas
Callen
Captieux
Commensacq
Garein
Hostens
Labouheyre
Labrit
Le Barp
Lencouacq
Le Teich
Le Tuzan
Le Sen
Louchats
Lucmau
Luglon
Lugos
Luxey
Mano
Marcheprime
Mios
Moustey
Muret
Origne
Pissos
Sabres
Salles
Saint-Léger-de-Balson
Saint-Magne
Saint-Symphorien
Saugnacq-et-Muret
Solférino
Sore
Trensacq
Vert

Major features

The park maintains a bird sanctuary on Arcachon Bay, the parc ornithologique du Teich. Throughout the year, over 300,000 migratory birds take refuge in its wetlands.

At several sites throughout the park, there are sections of the regional museum, Ḗcomusée de la Grande Lande, which host exhibitions about the history, development and maintenance of the natural lands. The museum also organizes various events focused on Gascon lifestyles and traditions.

The local villages also organize their own events. Thousands of visitors come every year to the Flower Show at Garein, an annual weekend event which celebrated its 25th anniversary in 2010.

Administration
The park is administered by a joint union of local authorities in the Syndicat Mixte du Parc Naturel Régional des Landes de Gascogne, a deliberative assembly of 45 members. The union includes public and private representatives of Gironde, Landes, and Aquitaine.

Park emblem
The park's unique emblem is derived from a woodcut, still visible today, made on the beam of an old building in Luxey. The scene depicts a leaping fox frustrated in its hunt: a solid horizontal line separates him from the hen who strolls serenely in the sun. The situation was a familiar one in the Gascony moors where generations of farmers built their livestock shelters on stilts.

See also
 List of regional natural parks of France

References

External links

 Official park site 
 French Ministry of Agriculture: Report on Landes de Gascogne 1998-1999-2000 and effects of the storm of 27/12/1999

Regional natural parks of France
Geography of Gironde
Geography of Landes (department)
Protected areas established in 1970
Tourist attractions in Nouvelle-Aquitaine
Tourist attractions in Landes (department)
Tourist attractions in Gironde